Andrew McKay (born 18 February 1981 in Guildford, Surrey) is an English actor, most well known for playing the role of Daniel Renshaw in Family Affairs from 2001 to 2002. He has more recently appeared as Al in EastEnders during August 2006.

External links

English male soap opera actors
Living people
1981 births
Male actors from Surrey
Actors from Guildford
21st-century English male actors